Bi-quinary coded decimal is a numeral encoding scheme used in many abacuses and in some early computers, including the Colossus. The term bi-quinary indicates that the code comprises both a two-state (bi) and a five-state (quinary) component. The encoding resembles that used by many abacuses, with four beads indicating either 0 through 4 or 5 through 9 and another bead indicating which of those ranges.

Several human languages, most notably Fula and Wolof also use biquinary systems. For example, the Fula word for 6, jowi e go'o, literally means five [plus] one. Roman numerals use a symbolic, rather than positional, bi-quinary base, even though Latin is completely decimal.

The Korean finger counting system Chisanbop uses a bi-quinary system, where each finger represents a one and a thumb represents a five, allowing one to count from 0 to 99 with two hands.

One of the advantages of bi-quinary encoding on digital computers is that it must have 2 bits set, one in the binary field and one in the quinary field, and thus there is a built in "checksum" to see if the number is valid or not.  Stuck bits happened frequently with computers using mechanical relays.

Examples

Several different representations of bi-quinary coded decimal have been used by different machines. The two-state component is encoded as one or two bits, and the five-state component is encoded using three to five bits. Some examples are:
 Roman and Chinese abacuses
 Stibitz relay calculators at Bell Labs from Model II onwards
 FACOM 128 relay calculators at Fujitsu

 IBM 650 – seven bits
 Two bi bits: 0 5 and five quinary bits: 0 1 2 3 4, with error checking.
 Exactly one bi bit and one quinary bit is set in a valid digit. In the pictures of the front panel below and in close-up, the bi-quinary encoding of the internal workings of the machine are evident in the arrangement of the lights – the bi bits form the top of a T for each digit, and the quinary bits form the vertical stem.
 (the machine was running when the photograph was taken and the active bits are visible in the close-up and just discernible in the full panel picture)

 Remington Rand 409 - five bits
One quinary bit (tube) for each of 1, 3, 5, and 7 - only one of these would be on at the time.
The fifth bi bit represented 9 if none of the others were on; otherwise it added 1 to the value represented by the other quinary bit.
(sold in the two models UNIVAC 60 and UNIVAC 120)

 UNIVAC Solid State – four bits
One bi bit: 5, three binary coded quinary bits: 4 2 1 and one parity check bit

 UNIVAC LARC – four bits
One bi bit: 5, three Johnson counter-coded quinary bits and one parity check bit

See also
 Binary-coded decimal
 Binary number
 Chisanbop
 Finger binary
 Quinary
 Two-out-of-five code
 FACOM 128

References

Further reading
  (NB. Supersedes MIL-HDBK-231(AS) (1970-07-01).)

Computer arithmetic
Numeral systems